The Caroline W. and M. Louise Flanders House is a house located in southwest Portland, Oregon listed on the National Register of Historic Places.

See also
 National Register of Historic Places listings in Southwest Portland, Oregon

References

Further reading

1926 establishments in Oregon
Houses completed in 1926
Houses on the National Register of Historic Places in Portland, Oregon
Portland Historic Landmarks
Southwest Hills, Portland, Oregon